The 2019–20 Sudan Premier League is the 49th season of the Sudan Premier League, the top-tier football league in Sudan. The season started on 16 August 2019 and ended on 24 October 2020.

League table

Relegation play-offs

References

Sudan Premier League seasons
Sudan
football
football